Bala Rugby Football Club is a rugby union team from the market town of Bala, North Wales. Bala RFC is a member of the Welsh Rugby Union  and is a feeder club for the Scarlets.

2008/09 season
In 2009, Bala became the first team from the SWALEC Division Four North, also known as Division 1 North, to enter a play-off with the champions of Division Five North to decide the club's league place the next season. Due to league restructuring the bottom two clubs were automatically relegated, but Bala who lay in third from bottom place faced Bro Ffestiniog RFC who were champions of Division Five. Bala lost the game, which saw them relegated.

References

Welsh rugby union teams
Bala, Gwynedd